The Kings of Hong Kong is the second album by 22-Pistepirkko. It was released in 1987 (see 1987 in music).

Track listing
"I'm Back"
"Geronimo"
"Last Night"
"Big Bed"
"Hong Kong King"
"Hank's TV Set"
"Don't Try to Tease Me"
"I'm Staying Now"
"Lost Lost Love"
"B-Instrumental"
"Motorcycle Man"
"Searching & Looking"
"Horseman's Son"

References

1987 albums
22-Pistepirkko albums